This is a list of the amphibian species recorded in Guinea-Bissau.

Arthroleptidae
Arthroleptis poecilonotus
Leptopelis bufonides
Leptopelis viridis
Bufonidae
Amietophrynus maculatus
Amietophrynus regularis
Hemisotidae
Hemisus guineensis
Hyperoliidae
Hyperolius concolor
Hyperolius nitidulus
Hyperolius occidentalis
Hyperolius spatzi
Kassina senegalensis
Ranidae
Hoplobatrachus occipitalis
Hylarana galamensis
Pipidae
Pseudhymenochirus merlini
Silurana tropicalis
Phrynobatrachidae
Phrynobatrachus calcaratus
Phrynobatrachus francisci
Phrynobatrachus minutus
Phrynobatrachus natalensis
Phrynobatrachus tokba
Ptychadenidae
Ptychadena ansorgii
Ptychadena bibroni
Ptychadena mascareniensis
Ptychadena oxyrhynchus
Ptychadena pumilio

References

Auliya, M., Wagner, P., Böhme, W. (2012). The herpetofauna of the Bijagós archipelago, Guinea-Bissau (West Africa) and a first country-wide checklist. Bonn Zoological Bulletin 61(2), 255-281.

Guinea-Bissau
Guinea-Bissau
amphibians